This is a list of Colombian Academy Award winners and nominees. This list details the performances of Colombian filmmakers, actors, actresses and films that have either been nominated for or have won an Academy Award.

Best Actress in a Leading Role
This list focuses on Colombian-born actors and actresses.

Best International Feature Film

This list focuses on Colombian films that won or were nominated for the Best International Feature Film award.

Best Documentary Short Subject

See also

Cinema of Colombia
List of Colombian films

Colombia
Academy Award winners
Academy Award winners